The Hsingneng Power Plant, Star Energy Power Plant or Changbin Power Plant is a gas-fired power plant in Chang-Bin Industrial Park, Lukang Township, Changhua County, Taiwan.

History
The power plant was commissioned in March 2004 and started its operation in April 2004.

Technical specifications
The power plant consists of one combined cycle unit generation with an installed capacity of 490 MW.

See also

 List of power stations in Taiwan
 Electricity sector in Taiwan

References

2004 establishments in Taiwan
Buildings and structures in Changhua County
Energy infrastructure completed in 2004
Natural gas-fired power stations in Taiwan